Basketball is the second (form some seasons was the third) most popular sport in Cape Verde.  The league are divided into eleven divisions, Santiago and Santo Antão has two zones since the early 2000s.  The basketball association is a federation which is known as the Capeverdean Basketball Federation (Federação Caboverdiana de Basquetebol or FCBB). The FCBB became was founded in 1986 and became affiliated to FIBA in 1988.

Its current president is Kitana Cabral.  The country had 43 basketball teams as of 2015.

Professional leagues 

In 2021, the Praia Basketball League was established, becoming the first professional league in Cape Verde. It changed its name to become the Cabo Verde Basketball League in 2022, and features six teams.

Regional leagues
The divisions numbers eleven on nine islands, seven has an island league and two contains two zones.

Island or regional championships
The light blue indicates a league having first and second divisions. Between the early 2000s and 2017, Santiago had a North and South competition.

About the Basketball Championships (Island and National)
The Cape Verdean Basketball Championships takes place each year.  The winner of each regional league (sometimes a runner-up qualifies when a club wins the national title) competes in the national championships each year. I is one of the remaining countries in the world that uses the old system of qualification.

History
The popularity of basketball in Cape Verde did not grow until the country's independence in 1975.  That time, it was in the shadow of the popularity of football (soccer) along with most of Africa.

Basketball clubs and competition were rising in around the 1980s and 1990s.

Seven Stars won in 2011.

AD Bairro won the 2015 national championships and was the first club ever to compete in the African competition, Bairro finished 8th in the African Basketball Champions League.

Basketball Championships
This article list the available information of the national title wins:

2011: Seven Stars
2012: AD Bairro
2014: Académica do Mindelo
2015: AD Bairro

Basketball clubs
Here are a list of some popular basketball clubs (or teams) in Cape Verde, the right indicates where they participate in an island championships:

ABC da Praia - Santiago Championships
Académica do Mindelo - São Vicente Championships
Achadinha - Santiago Championships - withdrew
Desportivo de Assomada
AD Bairro - Santiago Championships
Black Panthers - Santiago Championships - no longer participant
Beira Mar do Tarrafal - Santiago Championships - withdrew
GS Castilho - São Vicente Championships
GDRC Delta - Santiago South Championships - withdrew
Desportivo da Praia? - Santiago South Championships
Os Garridos? - Santiago Championships - withdrew
Os Guardiões - Santiago Championships
Lem Ferreira - Santiago Championships - withdrew
Lenfer - Santiago Championships
Lapaloma/Eugénio Lima (Lapaloma) - Santiago Championships (South)
Palmarejo Bulls - Santiago South Championships
Ponta de Água - Santiago Championships
Prédio - Santiago South Championships
GDRC Pretoria - Sal Championships
GDR São Lourenço - Santiago Championships
Seven Stars - Santiago Championships
Spartak d'Aguadinha - Fogo Championships
CD Travadores - Santiago Championships - former team
Unidos do Norte - Santiago Championships

Best Cape Verdean Basketball Player
The Best Basketball Player (Mejor Baloncesta Caboverdiano) are honored once every year.  Here is a couple of list:

2010-11  Ivan Almeida

MVP of the Cape Verdean Basketball Premier Division
2009-10:  Ivan Almeida
2010-11:  Ivan Almeida

Arenas and facilities
Basketball facilities in Cape Verde include:

Gimnodesportivo Vava Duarte - Praia
Polidesportivo João de Joia - Mosteiros
Polidesportivo Simão Mendes - São Filipe
Polidesportivo do Mindelo - São Vicente Island
Polidesportivo Municipal do Sal - Espargos
Polidesportivo de Tarrafal - Tarrafal on Santiago Island

References